Currently there are about 40 extant families of Lacertilia. These vary considerably, e.g. in shades, colours, and sizes. For example, the largest representative among Geckos, the New Caledonian giant gecko (Rhacodactylus leachianus), has a length of up to 36 cm (14 in), while the largest species in the family Varanidae, Komodo dragon (Varanus komodoensis), has a length up to 3 metres (10 ft), and a body mass of 70 kg (154 lbs).

Largest extant lizards
Here are the 15 largest extant lizards based on the most reliable measurements for size, including length and weight. These include family types Varanidae, Iguanidae and Teiidae exceeding 9 kg (20 lbs) in mass.

By families

Agamas (Agamidae) 

The largest representatives in this group are species in the genus Hydrosaurus, which often exceed 1 metre (3.3 ft) in length.
The largest species – Makassar salfin lizard (Hydrosaurus microlophus) and Sulawesi black salfin lizard (Hydrosaurus celebensis) growing a length of 1.2 (3.9 ft) and 1.13 m (3.7 ft) respectively.
A Weber's salfin lizard (Hydrosaurus weberi), Philippine salfin lizard (Hydrosaurus pustulatus) and Amboina salfin lizard (Hydrosaurus amboinensis) (previously counts the largest species in this group), have a length of 1 m (3.3 ft).
The Australian water dragon (Intellagama lesueurii) and Chinese water dragon (Physignathus cocincinus) can also exceed this length.
The frilled lizard (Chlamydosaurus kingii) has length up to 85 cm (2.79 ft) and mass up to 870 g (1.92 lb), probably even 900 g (2 lb)
Uromastyx aegyptia is one of heaviest representatives among agamas, with length up to 76 cm (30 in) and mass 2 kg (4.4 lbs).                                           

American legless lizards (Anniellidae) 

Glass lizards (Anguidae) 

Many representatives of this family are legless lizards.
However, this family also has lizards with legs, among which the largest is the Texas alligator lizard (Gerrhonotus infernalis) growing to from 45.7 cm (18 in) till 64 cm (25.2 in) in different sources.

Chameleons (Chamaeleonidae) 

Of all chameleons, the largest is the Parson's chameleon (Calumma parsonii), reaching a length of 68 cm (27 in). But the longest species is the Malagasy giant chameleon (Furcifer oustaleti). It has a length of up to 68.5 cm (27 in).
Other large chameleons are the veiled chameleon (Chameleo calyptratus) and Meller's chameleon (Trioceros melleri), with lengths of up to 61 cm (24 in) Exceptionally large specimens of the latter have reputedly reached over 76 cm (30 in) and mass 600 g (1.3 lb), although this is unlikely.

Spinytail lizards (Cordylidae) 

Many species in this family are small to medium-sized lizards that range in length from 6 to 30 cm (2.4 to 11.8 inches). There are large species in the genus Smaug, the largest of which is a giant girdled lizard (Smaug giganteus), with snout-vent length up to 20.5 cm (8.07 in) and total length up to roughly 40 cm (15.74 in).

Casquehead lizards (Corytophanidae) 

Casquehead lizards are quite large lizards. In particular, the genus Basiliscus typically measures 70–75 cm (28–30 in). But the largest species in this group is the plumed basilisk (Basiliscus plumifrons), frequently growing to 91 cm (36 in).
Another large species in this group is the eastern casquehead iguana (Laemanctus longipes) reaching up to 70 cm (27.6 in) including its long, thin tail.

Collared lizards (Crotaphytidae) 

In this family it is not known exactly which species is the largest, but according to current data the largest is the reticulated collared lizard (Crotaphytus reticulatus) with length up to 41 cm (16 in) and mass 78.77 g (2.8 oz).

Anoles (Dactyloidae) 

Large species in this group are usually crown giant anolis ecomorphs The species generally considered the largest is the knight anole (Anolis equestris), which can reach up to 51 cm (20 in) in total length, 19 cm (7.5 in) in snout-vent length and weigh 137 g (4.83 oz).  
However, in the equester species complex there are also species reaching the same length and even larger. These include A. baracoae, A. luteogularis, A. noblei and A. smallwoodi.

Geckos (Gekkota) 

Species of geckos belong to different groups. For example, many species of geckos are in family Gekkonidae, but there are very large species in the family Diplodactylidae. For example, to them belongs the largest gecko species New Caledonian giant gecko (Rhacodactylus leachianus), which can be 36–43.18 cm (14–17 in) long and mass 212–279 g (7.5–9.8 oz)
Other representatives of the same genus as the aforementioned gecko can also reach huge sizes. These include gargoyle gecko (Rhacodactylus auriculatus), greater rough-snouted giant gecko (Rhacodactylus trachyrhynchus) and lesser rough-snouted giant gecko (Rhacodactylus trachycephalus). As well as former species in this genus: crested gecko (Correlophus ciliatus), Sarasins' giant gecko  (Correlophus sarasinorum) and Bavay's giant gecko (Mniarogekko chahoua).
A extant member of the genus Hoplodactylus, Duvaucel's gecko (Hoplodactylus duvaucelii), in which be present a largest gecko ever lived (see the largest extinct lizards) can also reach large sizes. It can reach total length 30 cm (12 in) with a snout-vent length (SVL) up to 16 cm (6.3 in), and weigh up to 120 grams (4.2 oz).
There are also large species in the family Gekkonidae. These include tokay gecko (Gekko gekko), Smith's green-eyed gecko (Gekko smithii) and Andaman giant gecko (Gekko verreauxi), which can reach and even exceed 30 cm (12 in).
Another genus with large geckos is Uroplatus. The largest representative in this genus is the giant leaf-tail gecko (Uroplatus giganteus), which can reach a snout–vent length of 20 cm and a total length of 32.2 cm. Another species that grows almost as large is the common flat-tail gecko (Uroplatus fimbriatus), which can exceed 30 cm (12 in) and more.
The genus Phelsuma in subfamily Uroplatinae also has large species.
Outside of the families Diplodactylidae and Gekkonidae, there are large geckoes among the Eublepharidae. The leopard gecko (Euplepharis macularis) reaches even large sizes – up to 28 cm (11 in) long with a mass of 60–80 g (2.1–2.84 oz).

Plated lizards (Gerrhosauridae) 

The largest species in this family is the giant plated lizard (Matobosaurus validus), with a total length of up to 69 cm (27 in) or even 75 cm (29.5 in), with a snout-vent length (SVL) of 28 cm (11 in). Another large plated lizard is the Sudan plated lizard (Broadleysaurus major), with a length of about 51–60 cm (20–24 in).

Beaded lizards and Gila monster (Helodermatidae)

But despite the stocky and massive body of this lizard, it is not the largest representative of the family.

Iguanas (Iguanidae) 

They are the largest lizards after some large species of monitor lizards, and the largest lizards in the New World. Iguanas vary considerably in size and form, but even the smallest lizards in this family are still quite large. For example, the desert iguana (Dipsosaurus dorsalis) can reach a length of up to 61 cm (24 in).
However, the heaviest species in this family is the blue iguana (Cyclura lewisi), with a total length of up to 1.5 m (4.91 ft), a SVL of 51–76 cm (30 in) and a mass of up to  It is the eighth-heaviest and largest extant lizard.

It is the second-heaviest iguanid after the blue iguana and the ninth-heaviest and largest lizard in the world.
The marine iguana (Amblyrhynchus cristatus) is the tenth-largest extant lizard in the world, and the largest reptile on Galapagos Islands after the Galapagos land iguana, not including turtles reaching a maximum total length of 1.4 m (4.59 ft), a SVL of from 12 till 56 cm (from 4.72 till 22 in)  and a mass of from  depending on islands.
A member of the genus Iguana, lesser Antillean iguana (Iguana delicatissima) can reach SVL , and mass .

True lizards (Lacertidae) 

This family includes 300 diverse species. Another large lizard in this genus are La Gomera giant lizard (Gallotia brovoana), reaching a length of almost  and a SVL in  
However, on the other hand, it is very little data to confirm this, and therefore the aforementioned Gran Canaria giant lizard is usually considered the largest representative of its family.
The European green lizard (Lacerta viridis), Iberian emerald lizard (Lacerta schreiberi) and western green lizard (Lacerta bilineata) can exceed a length  and more, and with a SVL at least .

Earless monitor lizards (Lanthanotidae)

Curly-tailed lizards (Leiocephalidae)

The dorsal scales are keeled and pointed. L. carinatus resembles lizards of the genus Sceloporus, but with the tail usually curled upward, especially when the lizard is in a horizontal position on rocks or on the ground.

Leiosaurids (Leiosauridae)

The species is reproduces sexually and is gonochoric.

Liolaemids (Liolaemidae)

Members of the genus Liolaemus are vary considerably in size (45–100 millimetres or 1.8–3.9 inches snout–vent length) and weight (3–200 grams or 0.1–7.1 ounces). The largest species are L. chlorostictus (85 mm max. SVL), L. dorbignyi  (98.3 mm max. SVL), L. duellmani  (83 mm max. SVL), L. forsteri  (93 mm max. SVL), L. foxi  (82.9 mm max. SVL), L. huayra (94.3 mm max. SVL),  L. inti (90.4 mm max. SVL), L. jamesi (97.5 mm max. SVL), L. melanogaster (91 mm max. SVL), L. nigriceps (88.8 mm max. SVL), L. orientalis (99.2 mm max. SVL), L. patriciaiturrae (96.5 mm max. SVL), L. puritamensis (90.8 mm max. SVL), L. robertoi (84 mm max. SVL), L. scrocchii (95 mm max. SVL) and L. stolzmanni (92 mm max. SVL). The L. fabiani, L. filiorum,  L. pachecoi, L. pleopholis, L. polystictus, L. robustus, L. thomasi, L. vallecurensis, L. vulcanus, and L. williamsi, L. austromendocinus, L. elongatus, L. gununakuna, L. petrophilus, and L. thermarum also may reach large sizes (around 10 cm)

Madagascan iguanas (Opluridae) 

Legless lizards (Pygopodidae) 

Skinks (Scincidae) 

In this family very lot of species – about 1500.
In the genus Tiliqua be present also other a large species of skinks.
The genus Chalcides includes many legless or almost legless skinks. In the genus Acontias also are limbless skinks many of which are quite small lizards, but the largest among these is giant legless skink (Acontias plumbeus) at approximately reaching 40 cm (16 in) in length.
Its extinct relative is Mauritian giant skink (Leiolopisma mauritiana), which in twice excelled to length of its contemporary (see the largest extinct lizards) and was the biggest known skink of all time.

Tegus and Teiids (Teiidae)

A many of teiids are quite small lizards. Although some members such as tegus are one of the biggest lizards in the world after monitor lizards and iguanas.

Monitor lizards (Varanidae) 
The family includes both the largest living lizards and the largest lizards that have ever existed, yet about a third of the living species are dwarfs that seldom exceed  in weight. Such massive size disparity between species makes the group ideal model animals to study the effects of gigantism on ecology and physiology, but at present little of their potential in this field has been explored. Some of the largest representatives of the Varanidae such as the Komodo dragon, crocodile monitor, perentie and lace monitor can count an apex predators. In the list of the largest lizards, monitors occupy the first seven places.
Komodo dragon (Varanus komodoensis)

The largest males from Komodo, may reach more 80 kg (176.3 lb). As stated above, females are generally much smaller than males. The largest accurately measured individual according to Gerard Wood for Guinness World Records was a specimen put on display at the Saint Louis Zoological Park, Missouri in 1937. Once again captive animal are typically overweight to a certain degree so this weight is again much higher than what is achievable by wild individuals.

Asian water monitor (Varanus salvator)

The Asian water monitor (Varanus salvator) is second-biggest lizard in the world after Komodo dragon, and also the longest lizard in the world. The largest specimens come from Malaysia, particularly around the Cameron Highlands, where specimens over 2.5 m (8.2 ft) in TL (total length) are sometimes encountered. Thailand is also home to some huge  water monitors but, elsewhere the water monitor grows smaller sizes. Unverified weights of 50, 70 and even 90 kg (110, 150 and even 198 pounds) have been reported in escaped pets in Florida but such enormous weights remain unverified.

Crocodile monitor (Varanus salvadorii)

The crocodile monitor (Varanus salvadorii) usually counts the longest lizard in the world. Approved what the biggest specimens can exceed in the length of 3 meters (10 ft). The tail of the species is proportionally very long with some sources claiming it to average 210% of the animal's snout to vent length. The book, "The Guinness Book of Animal Facts and Feats" cites an individual with a recorded total length of  however, such a large size has not been verified.

Nile monitor (Varanus niloticus)

The Nile monitor (Varanus niloticus) is the largest lizard native to Africa alive today and fourth or fifth-largest lizard in the world after Komodo dragon, Asian water monitor, crocodile monitor and competes with perentie. The same author also reports that he shot another monitor lizard approximately 2.5 m (8.2 ft) long. The largest female Nile monitor for which there is reliable data reached . Thus, it seems likely that in South Africa some specimens can reach lengths of 200 cm (6.6 ft) or more, but they are very rare.

Perentie (Varanus giganteus)

The perentie (Varanus giganteus) is by average length and weight the largest extant lizard native to Australia and fifth or fourth-biggest lizard in the world after Komodo dragon, Asian water monitor, crocodile monitor and competes with Nile monitor. Its endemic to arid central Australia, found west of the Great Dividing Range. The largest individual recorded by (Stokes, 1846) measuring 2438 mm (8 ft) in total length. However based on the vagueness of this account some authors claim Stokes' reported measurement of 2438 mm (8 ft) is exaggerated and a more likely maximum length may instead be  (Stirling, 1912). The maximum size of the perentie is probably not as great as many authors claim King & Green (1993) provide a useful discussion of size in this species. Strimple (1988) suggested that one of these animals was the type specimen used by Gray, which has a total length of only . Many perenties do not grow to such an enormous size, and the specimens on Barrow Island may grow larger than the main population. The limited data available suggests that females reach a smaller maximum size than males, rarely exceeding  TL. Bredl (1987) records males of  TL, and a female of  TL. It appears that perenties approaching 2 m (6.6 ft) in length are the exception rather than the rule, and that in general few specimens grow larger than 1.5 m (4.91 ft). If specimens of 2.4 m (7.9 ft) or more have ever existed, none seem to have survived to the present.

Black-throated monitor (Varanus albigularis microstictus)
The black-throated monitor (Varanus albigularis microstictus) is a subspecies of rock monitor (Varanus albigularis) and, perhaps, the heaviest lizard in Africa. Although, little information is available on the size of this species of monitor lizards. According to many information black-throated monitor attains 2.1 m (6.89 ft) in length and 27 kg (60 lb) in mass. However, unknown whether this mass is reached in captivity or in the wild. However, specimens  for this species rock monitor was recorded.

Lace monitor (Varanus varius)

The lace monitor (Varanus varius) is the second-largest lizard in Australia after perentie and seven-largest lizard in the world overall. None of this size exist now and specimens of 2 m (6.6 ft) TL are exceptional. It was found to have eaten four foxcubs, three young rabbits and three large blue-tongued skinks, and all this was taken into account when weighing, is unknown. Males grow larger than females and probably have larger home ranges.

In the genus Varanus has more 80 species of lizards and all of to 11 subgenera, members which vary considerably in sizes:

Subgenus Empagusia 

Even so, by some reports it grows much larger.

Subgenus Euprepiosaurus 

Subgenus Hapturosaurus 

Subgenus Odatria 
Whilst, in this subgenus have a lot of species, they are the smallest monitor lizards.

Subgenus Papusaurus 
The only species Papusaurus is a crocodile monitor (Varanus salvadorii) (see higher).

Subgenus Philippinosaurus 

This are large frugivorous monitor lizards ( long or more with a mass in >).

Subgenus Polydaedalus 
The largest species Polydaedalus are the nile monitor (Varanus niloticus) and the black-throated monitor (Varanus albigularis microstictus) (see higher).
Although, large sizes may reach also other members of Polydaedalus.

Subgenus Psammosaurus 

The subgenus Psammosaurus includes in its a large lizards and medium by size monitor lizards, growing the length of don't less .

Subgenus Solomonosaurus 

Subgenus Soterosaurus 
The largest Soterosaurus is an Asian water monitor (Varanus salvator) (see higher).
Second hugest after Asian water monitor are the marbled water monitor (Varanus marmoratus) and the Palawan water monitor (Varanus palawanensis) with a total length of almost  (SVL of last one measuring ).
Even medium-sized monitors this subgenus are quite large.

Subgenus Varanus 

The largest members of this group are the Komodo dragon (Varanus komodoensis), perentie (Varanus giganteus) and lace monitor (Varanus varius) (see higher).

Night lizards (Xantusidae) 

Knob-scaled lizards (Xenosauridae) 

See also
 Megalania – the largest land lizard to have ever lived
 Mosasauridae, an extinct family in the order Squamata which includes the largest lizards of the world
 List of largest reptiles
 List of largest snakes
 List of largest extinct lizards

References

Sources
 

Lists of reptiles
Lizards
Lists of largest animals